The Stinson L-1 Vigilant (company designation Model 74) is an American liaison aircraft designed by the Stinson Aircraft Company of Wayne, Michigan and manufactured at the Vultee-Stinson factory in Nashville, Tennessee (in August 1940 Stinson became a division of Vultee Aircraft Corporation). The aircraft was operated by the United States Army Air Corps as the O-49 until 1942.

Design and development
The Vigilant was designed in response to a 1938 United States Army Air Corps design competition for a two-seat light observation aircraft. After the German-manufactured Fieseler Storch was demonstrated at the 4th International Air Meet in Zurich, Switzerland in 1937, the Air Corps Material Division at Wright Field initiated a feasibility study for the creation of a similar aircraft. The development program was approved in January 1938, design and performance specifications were determined in April 1938, and a Circular Proposal for a formal design competition was released to manufacturers in August 1938, just twelve days before a Storch was demonstrated at the Cleveland Air Races by German aviator Emil Kropf.  Stinson (later a division of Vultee), won the $1.5 million contract over 11 competitors, including the Bellanca YO-50 and Ryan YO-51 Dragonfly.

Stinson won the $1.5 million contract with an initial order for 100 aircraft. Eleven competing designs included the Bellanca YO-50 and Ryan YO-51 Dragonfly that were each runners-up and garnered 3-plane contracts for further evaluation. The Stinson Model 74 was a radial-engined, high-wing monoplane with large trailing-edge slotted flaps and full-span leading-edge automatic slats for low-speed, high-lift, short-field performance. The Model 74 prototype was given the Army designation YO-49 for evaluation, with the first flight by test pilot Al Schramm on 15 July 1940.

The aircraft was built of chrome-molybdenum steel tubing and covered with doped cotton fabric; the engine cowling and the fuselage, forward of the wing, was fully enclosed in aluminum. Control surfaces and the empennage were fabric-covered stainless steel. The Lycoming power plant was hand-cranked with an inertial starter and was fitted with a Hamilton Standard constant speed propeller. At least 12 ambulance conversions were fitted with Edo 49-4000 floats (4,000-pound displacement) for amphibious landings and takeoffs.

The Vigilant could maintain stable, level flight at 31 miles per hour and in a 20 mph breeze it was capable of stopping in less than its own length. Given an adequate headwind, it gave the illusion of "hovering" and sometimes surprised onlookers by drifting backward. Under calm conditions the L-1 could land and take off again inside a 200 foot diameter circle, and landing over a 50-foot obstacle it could stop on dry sod within 300 feet with a ground roll of approximately 100 feet.

Operational history

The Stinson Vigilant was used in diverse roles such as towing training gliders, artillery spotting, liaison, emergency rescue, transporting supplies and special espionage flights. Another contract was later awarded for the O-49A which had a slightly longer fuselage and other equipment changes. In April 1942 the aircraft were redesignated the L-1 and L-1A (liaison).
Up to 17 L-1 and 96 L-1A aircraft were allocated to the British Royal Air Force under the Lend-Lease Act, with varying numbers given for aircraft actually delivered (see Variants, below). The RAF designated the aircraft the Vigilant Mk I and Vigilant Mk II respectively. General Harry Crerar, Commander of the First Canadian Army in Europe during World War II, maintained a Vigilant for his personal use.

Aircraft were modified for a variety of roles including as an ambulance aircraft. No further production orders were placed as the aircraft was superseded by procurement of vast numbers of both the militarized Piper J-3 Cub, the L-4 Grasshopper (in addition to Aeronca's and Taylorcraft's similar conversions), and Stinson's own L-5 Sentinel, itself produced in nearly 4,000 examples; were all generically classified as "puddle-jumper" aircraft.

A Vigilant was modified in 1943–1944 for experiments in boundary layer control.

Variants

Stinson Model 74 company designation
O-49 Vigilant U.S. Army designation for first production batch, 142 built.
L-1 Vigilant 1942 redesignation of O-49.
O-49A Vigilant Fuselage lengthened  182 built.
O-49B Vigilant Conversion to ambulance variant, three or four converted.
L-1A Vigilant 1942 redesignation of O-49A.
L-1B Vigilant 1942 redesignation of O-49B.
L-1C Vigilant L-1A ambulance variant, 113 converted.
L-1D Vigilant L-1A training glider tug, 14 to 21 converted.
L-1E Vigilant L-1 amphibious ambulance variant, seven converted.
L-1F Vigilant L-1A amphibious ambulance variant, five conversions.
Vigilant Mk I RAF designation of L-1, 14 to 17 allocated by Lend Lease
Vigilant Mk II RAF designation of L-1A, 96 allocated, circa 13 to 54 delivered
CQ-2 Vigilant US Navy conversion of L-1A to target control aircraft, one or more converted

Operators

 Royal Air Force

 United States Army Air Corps

Surviving aircraft
Airworthy
 40-3102 – operated by the Fantasy of Flight in Polk City, Florida. This aircraft flew for the first time after restoration on 18 July 2013.
 41-18915 – operated by the Alaska Aviation Heritage Museum in Anchorage, Alaska.
 41-19031 – privately owned and operated in Blaine, Minnesota. 
On Display
 41-19039 – National Museum of the United States Air Force in Dayton, Ohio.
Under restoration or in storage
 40-0283 – under restoration by G & P.M. Turner in London.
 40-3141 – in storage at the United States Army Aviation Museum at Fort Rucker, Alabama.

Specifications (L-1A)

See also

References

Notes

Bibliography

 Adcock, Al. US Liaison Aircraft in action (Aircraft in Action: No. 195). Carrollton, Texas: Squadron/Signal Publications, 2005. .
 Donald, David (ed.). American Warplanes of World War II. London: Aerospace Publishing, 1995. .
 Eden, Paul and Soph Moeng (eds.). The Complete Encyclopedia of World Aircraft. London: Amber Books Ltd., 2002. 
 Gray, James H. L-5 History Blog #17 (2021), and notes from the Wright Field Liaison Program papers at the National Archives. www.sentinelclub.org.
 Merriam, Ray (ed.). World War II Journal #15: U.S. Military Aircraft of World War II. Bennington, Vermont, USA: Merriam Press, 2002. .
 Ogden, Bob. Aviation Museums and Collections of North America. Tonbridge, Kent, UK: Air-Britain (Historians ) Ltd, 2007. .
 The Illustrated Encyclopedia of Aircraft (Part Work 1982–1985). London: Orbis Publishing, 1985.

External links

 Vultee L-1A Vigilant, National Museum of the United States Air Force
 Stinson O-49 on aerofiles

1940s United States military reconnaissance aircraft
Vigilant
Single-engined tractor aircraft
High-wing aircraft
Aircraft first flown in 1940